Gary Provost (November 14, 1944 – May 10, 1995) was an American writer and writing instructor, author of works including Make every word count: a guide to writing that works—for fiction and nonfiction (1980) and 100 Ways to Improve Your Writing: Proven Professional Techniques for Writing with Style and Power (1985).

Life and career
Provost grew up in Jamaica Plain, Massachusetts. Upon leaving school in 1962, Provost hitchhiked across the United States.

A children's book that Provost wrote with his wife, Gail, titled David and Max, won the 2007 Skipping Stones Honor Award.

His sudden death in 1995 interrupted his then-ongoing projects, including a book about Humphrey Bogart.

Complete work

Writing instructions 
Make Every Word Count (1990)

100 Ways To Improve Your Writing (1985)

How to Tell a Story: The Secrets of Writing Captivating Tales (1998) (with Peter Rubie)

Beyond Style: Mastering the Finer Points of Writing (1988)

The Freelance Writer's Handbook (1982)

How to Write and Sell True Crime (1991)

Make Your Words Work (1991)

True crime 
Perfect Husband: The True Story of the Trusting Bride Who Discovered Her Husband Was a Coldblooded Killer (1992)

Finder: The True Story of a Private Investigator (1988) (with Maryilin Greene)

Fatal Dosage: The True Story of a Nurse on Trial for Murder (1985)

Across The Border: The True Story of the Satanic Cult Killings in Matamoros, Mexico (1989)

Without Mercy: Obsession and Murder Under The Influence (1990)

Into Their Own Hands (1994)

Biography 
High Stakes: Inside the New Las Vegas (1994)

Bogart: In Search of My Father (1995) (by Stephen Bogart)

Finder: The True Story of a Private Investigator (1988) (with Marilyn Greene)

Mystery 
Baffled In Boston (2001)

Satire 
The Dorchester Gas Tank (2016)

Romance 
Share The Dream (1983)

Pre-teen novel 
Popcorn (1985) (with Gail Provost Stockwell)

David and Max (1988, winner of the 2007 Skipping Stones Book Award) (with Gail Provost Stockwell)

Good If It Goes (1984,winner of the 1985 National Jewish Book Award for Children's Literature) (with Gail Provost Stockwell)

The Pork Chop War (1982)

References

External links 
 Gary Provost website 

1944 births
1995 deaths
Writers of style guides
People from Jamaica Plain